The Chicago Business College (founded as the Gondering and Virden Business College in 1888) was a for-profit business school located at 67 Wabash Avenue in downtown Chicago, Illinois. It was run by Frederick B. Virden, who founded or purchased several such schools in subsequent years.

References 

Business schools in Illinois
Universities and colleges in Chicago
Educational institutions established in 1888
1888 establishments in Illinois
Private universities and colleges in Illinois